Valentyna Ivanivna Lutayeva (née Berzina, 18 June 1956 – 12 January 2023) was a Ukrainian handball player. She was part of the Soviet team that won a gold medal at the 1980 Olympics.

References

1956 births
2023 deaths
Sportspeople from Zaporizhzhia
Honoured Masters of Sport of the USSR
Handball players at the 1980 Summer Olympics
Medalists at the 1980 Summer Olympics
Olympic handball players of the Soviet Union
Olympic gold medalists for the Soviet Union
Olympic medalists in handball

Soviet female handball players
Ukrainian female handball players